Nurlan Satybaldyuly Auesbaev (born 5 May 1957) is a Kazakh politician who serves as the chairman of the Astana city branch of the Nationwide Social Democratic Party (JSDP) since 2021 and was the party's nominee for the 2022 presidential elections.

Biography 
Auesbayev was born on 5 May 1957 in South Kazakhstan Region. He studied at Auezov South Kazakhstan State University and moved to Astana.

In 2021, he was appointed as the chairman of the branch of the JSDP party in Astana. On 1 October 2022, at the 19th JSDP Extraordinary Congress, he was chosen as the party's candidate for the 2022 presidential election.

References 

Kazakhstani politicians
Nationwide Social Democratic Party politicians
Living people
1957 births
People from Turkistan Region